Notable music arrangers include:

A

Toshiko Akiyoshi
Erik Arvinder
Jeff Atmajian
Nick Ariondo

B

HB Barnum
Norman Bergen
Doug Besterman
Larry Blank
Buddy Bregman
Alan Broadbent
Christoph Brüx
Paul Buckmaster
Artie Butler

C

Charles Calello
Jorge Calandrelli
David Campbell
John Clayton Jr.
Rahn Coleman
Frank Comstock

D
Roberto Danova
Eumir Deodato
David Foster
Brent Fischer
Ernie Freeman

G

Gil Goldstein
Gordon Goodwin
Dave Grusin

H

Simon Hale
Johnny Harris
Norman Harris
Yukari Hashimoto
Jerry Hey
Larry Hochman
Lee Holdridge
Les Hooper

I

Nick Ingman
Merle J. Isaac

J

Booker T. Jones
John Paul Jones
Quincy Jones
Bradley Joseph
Tyler Joseph

K

Artie Kane
Roger Kellaway
Sirvan Khosravi
Ludwik Konopko

L
Michel Legrand
Ruslana Lyzhichko

M
Henry Mancini
Johnny Mandel
Anthony Marinelli
Carl Marsh
Bobby Martin
Rob Mathes
Frank McNamara
Sergio Mendes
Vince Mendoza
Alan Menken
Bob Mintzer
Ennio Morricone
Rob Mounsey
Manoj George

N
Richard Niles

O

Claus Ogerman
Tale Ognenovski

P
Gene Page
Conrad Pope
Rita Porfiris
Pino Presti
André Previn

R

Ray Reach
Les Reed
William Ross
Paul Riser
Davide Rossi
George Russell

S

Lalo Schifrin
Maria Schneider
Vic Schoen
Don Sebesky
Deke Sharon
Randy Slaugh

T

Octave Octavian Teodorescu
George Tipton
Doron Toister
Steve Tirpak
Danny Troob
Jonathan Tunick

V

Tommy Vig

W

Chris Walden
Steve Weisberg
Harold Wheeler
Patrick Williams

Past arrangers

A
Johnny Allen

B

John Barry
George Bassman
Les Baxter
Louie Bellson
Robert Russell Bennett
Harry Betts
Perry Botkin Jr.
Bob Brookmeyer
Ralph Burns
William David Brohn

C

John Cameron
Benny Carter
Al Cohn
Michel Colombier
Ray Conniff
Don Costa

D

Tadd Dameron
George Duke
Frank De Vol

E
Jack Elliott
Ray Ellis
Gil Evans

F

Percy Faith
Robert Farnon
Bill Finegan
Clare Fischer
Ernie Freeman

G

Douglas Gamley
Russell Garcia
Robert Graettinger

H

Rene Hall
Norman Harris
Isaac Hayes
Neil Hefti
Ray Heindorf
Bill Holman

J

Michael Jackson 
Gordon Jenkins   
J. J. Johnson
Jimmy Jones
Thad Jones

K

Artie Kane
Michael Kamen
Peter Knight

L
Philip J. Lang
Rod Levitt
Mort Lindsey
Geoff Love

M

Henry Mancini
Arif Mardin
Billy May
Gary McFarland
Hal Mooney
Angela Morley
Jelly Roll Morton 
Gerry Mulligan
Manoj George

N

Sammy Nestico
Tommy Newsom

O

Chico O'Farrill
Sy Oliver
Glen Osser

P

Gene Page
Marty Paich
Ástor Piazzolla
Perez Prado
Tito Puente
Gene Puerling

R

Johnny Richards
Nelson Riddle 
Aldemaro Romero
Pete Rugolo
George Russell

S

Conrad Salinger
Eddie Sauter
John Serry, Sr.
Harry Simeone
Axel Stordahl
Billy Strayhorn
Ed Summerlin

T
Tommy Tycho

W

Paul Weston
Barry White
Ernie Wilkins
Gerald Wilson

Z

Torrie Zito

Arrangers